The Sawtelle Line was an interurban railway route operated by the Pacific Electric Railway that ran between Downtown Los Angeles and Santa Monica, California.

History
The line was constructed in segments by the Pasadena and Pacific Railway: Beverly Hills to Santa Monica and Santa Monica to Ocean Park in 1896, 4th and Hill Streets, to Beverly Hills in 1897, and finally Ocean Park to Venice in 1901. In 1908 the entire line was converted to standard gauge, with service beginning on May 1. The line came under control of the Pacific Electric in 1911 under the terms of the Great Merger.

When Pacific Electric took over operations, the service went as far as Venice. Cars ran as far as Playa del Rey between May and August 1916. The line was briefly through routed with the Venice Short Line for three months starting in November 1926, creating a loop service. By February 1927, most trips terminated at Santa Monica, with some cars serving the Ocean Park car house. Annual ridership peaked at 2,644,512 trips in 1929.

Service was virtually discontinued after July 7, 1940, as Pacific Electric only ran a single daily car between Vineyard and Beverly Hills to maintain the franchise. Full abandonment occurred on November 18, 1940.

Route

The Sawtelle Line followed the Venice Short Line as far as Vineyard Junction. At Vineyard Junction, the Sawtelle Line branched northwesterly. Inside the Vineyard grounds, dual tracks ramped upon fill to join a massive grade separation structure that carried the tracks over Pico Boulevard and down on to an unimproved private way in the center of the twin roadways of San Vicente Boulevard.

Continuing northwesterly, in the center of San Vicente Boulevard the dual tracks crossed the major intersections of La Brea, Hauser, and Olympic Boulevards, Fairfax Avenue, as well as Wilshire and La Cienega Boulevards. Then they continued one block west of La Cienega to Sherman Junction (at Le Doix Road), where the Sherman cut-off branched north (in the middle of San Vicente Boulevard) to Sherman (West Hollywood). From Sherman Junction, the Sawtelle Line turned west into private way, in the center of the twin roadways of Burton Way. Running west, the dual tracks crossed Robertson Boulevard, Doheny Drive, and some of the downtown Beverly Hills Streets to reach the Beverly Hills Station (located adjacent to Santa Monica Boulevard near Beverly Drive). 

At the Beverly Hills Station, the Sawtelle Line joined the Hollywood–Venice Line, and both lines were identical from that location to their common terminus at Woodward Avenue in Venice.

This line was one of four lines between Downtown and Santa Monica that did not run through Hollywood. This was the shortest route to Santa Monica.

List of major stops

References

Pacific Electric routes
History of Los Angeles
Light rail in California
Railway lines opened in 1901
1901 establishments in California
Railway lines closed in 1940
1940 disestablishments in California
Closed railway lines in the United States